The 10th Utah Senate District is located in West Jordan, South Jordan and Herriman.  It includes Utah House Districts 41, 42, 47, and 50 and 52. The current State Senator representing the 10th district is Lincoln Fillmore. Fillmore was elected to the Utah Senate in a special election after Senator Osmond resigned.

Previous Utah State Senators (District 10)

Election results

2004 General Election

2008 General Election Results

Note: Official results 11-19-08.

|}

See also

 Utah Democratic Party
 Utah Republican Party
 Utah Senate

References

External links
 Utah Senate District Profiles

10
Salt Lake County, Utah